Gossia gonoclada, known as the square-stemmed or angle-stemmed myrtle for the distinctive four raised corners on the angled branchlets, is a rainforest tree of the family Myrtaceae, native to south-east Queensland, Australia. It is an endangered species.

Etymology
The genus Gossia is named after former Queensland Premier, Wayne Goss. The specific epithet gonoclada means "angle-stemmed".

History
The tree was first discovered by Charles Stuart in Moggill in the 1850s. Thought to be extinct for nearly a century, it was rediscovered by Glenn Leiper and Janet Hauser in December 1986, and the Gossia gonoclada Recovery Team was established by the Logan City Council in December 1995.

Description
The leaves have four raised corners on angled branchlets, which are  flushed pink when new, becoming dark green and glossy on the upper surface, duller and paler below. They produce a distinct scent when crushed.

The bark is pale brown.  The white flowers are 6–9 mm in diameter and have 4–5 petals. The fruits are glossy berries 7–12 mm in diameter, ripening black. The flowering period is from October to November, with the fruits ripening from mid-January to February.

Distribution
Its known distribution is restricted to remnant lowland riparian rainforest between the Logan and Brisbane Rivers.

Conservation
In 2001, 64 of the only known 73 natural Gossia gonoclada  in the world were growing in the City of Logan. The Logan City Council has created the "Gossia gonoclada Recovery Plan 2019-2029", and  had planted 160 saplings around the city.

References

 

Flora of Queensland
Myrtales of Australia
Trees of Australia
gonoclada
Plants described in 1867
Taxa named by Ferdinand von Mueller